Moses Hall, formerly known as Eshelman Hall, is a historic building on the campus of the University of California, Berkeley in Berkeley, California. It was built in 1931, and designed in the Tudor Revival and Gothic Revival styles by architect George W. Kelham. It was first named for John Morton Eshleman, and it was renamed for Bernard Moses in 1963. The building houses the Institute of Governmental Studies on the first floor, and the Howison Philosophy Library on the third floor. In 2023, Bernard Moses' name was removed from the building due to his racist and colonialist beliefs which were found in many of his writings.

References

University and college buildings completed in 1931
University of California, Berkeley buildings
Gothic Revival architecture in California
Tudor Revival architecture in California